Lamprosema inglorialis is a moth in the family Crambidae. It was described by George Hampson in 1918. It is found in Cameroon and Yemen.

References

Moths described in 1918
Lamprosema
Moths of Africa
Moths of Asia